Netechma triangulum is a species of moth of the family Tortricidae. It is endemic to Ecuador (Morona-Santiago Province).

The ground colour of the forewings is cream suffused with pale brownish, but browner in the costal third. The hindwings are cream, tinged with brownish in the posterior half.

Etymology
The species name refers to the shape of the forewing markings and is derived from Latin triangulum (meaning triangle).

References

External links

Moths described in 2006
Fauna of Ecuador
triangulum
Moths of South America